Giuseppe Petrini was an Italian composer. His Graziello e Nella, a comic intermezzo for two voices and string orchestra, was recorded by Antonio Florio.

References

Italian composers
Italian male composers